Nuar Alsadir (born New Haven, Connecticut) is an American poet and psychoanalyst. She was a finalist for the 2017 National Book Critics Circle Award for Poetry, and was shortlisted  for the 2017 Forward Prize for Poetry. 

Her work has appeared in 'The Paris Review, The New York Times Magazine, LitHubThe Yale Review. and Granta.

 Works 

 More Shadow Than Bird (Salt Publishing, 2012).
 Fourth Person Singular (Liverpool University Press, 2017)
 Animal Joy,'' (Graywolf Press, 2022)

References 

American poets
Year of birth missing (living people)
Living people